The 1996 New Orleans Saints season was the team’s 30th as a member of the National Football League. They were unable to match their previous season's output of 7–9 and finished with the second-worst sixteen-game record in franchise history at 3–13. The team failed to qualify for the playoffs for the fourth straight year. 

Jim Mora, who had been the team’s head coach since 1986, resigned from his position after eight games with a 2-6 record to that point and was replaced by linebackers coach Rick Venturi, who went 1-7 to close the season. Mora’s resignation came one day after the Saints lost to the Carolina Panthers, where he ripped into his team’s performance during the game, calling it “horseshit” and “embarrassing” and saying the Saints could not do “diddley poo” offensively. 

The week 14 game vs. the St. Louis Rams drew a minuscule 26,310, the lowest-attended home game in Saints history, and 3,335 fewer than a 1987 game vs. the Rams played with replacement players due to that season's strike by the National Football League Players Association.

Offseason

NFL Draft

Personnel

Staff

Roster

Regular season

Schedule

Standings

References 

New Orleans Saints seasons
New Orleans Saints Season, 1996
New